Tripura Cricket Association is the governing body for cricket in Tripura state in India and for the Tripura cricket team. It is affiliated to the Board of Control for Cricket in India.

References

External links
 TCA website

Cricket administration in India
Cricket in Tripura
1968 establishments in Tripura
Sports organizations established in 1968
Organisations based in Tripura